The Ramesh Nagar Metro Station is located on the Blue Line of the Delhi Metro.

The station

Station layout

Entry/Exit

Connections

Bus
Delhi Transport Corporation bus routes number 234, 308, 408, 408CL, 408EXTCL, 410, 410ACL, 410CL, 801, 810, 813, 813CL, 816, 816A, 816EXT, 817, 817A, 817B, 820, 823, 832, 833, 841, 842, 847, 857, 871, 871A, 908, WDM (-) serves the station from outside metro station stop.

See also

 Delhi
 List of Delhi Metro stations
 Transport in Delhi
 Delhi Metro Rail Corporation
 Delhi Suburban Railway
 Delhi Monorail
 National Capital Region (India)
 List of rapid transit systems
 List of metro systems

References

External links

 
 UrbanRail.Net – Descriptions of all metro systems in the world, each with a schematic map showing all stations.

Delhi Metro stations
Railway stations opened in 2005
Railway stations in West Delhi district